"Summer of Love" is a song performed by German dance recording trio Cascada. It served as the lead single from their compilation album, Back on the Dancefloor, released on 30 March 2012 through Zooland Records. In Germany it peaked at #13, while it peaked at #7 in Austria, the song's highest peak.

Background
In an interview in January 2012, Natalie Horler from Cascada had mentioned the group would start working on more dance-like songs. In February, her Facebook page revealed that Cascada had recorded the track, and that many would love it. On 2 March 2012, it was revealed that the new single was called "Summer of Love", and would be released on 30 March. A preview was released on the same day, with many praising the track for its dance composition as opposed to the more "pop" sound of their past few singles which had led to a decline in record sales. It was released on 30 March in Germany, Austria, Switzerland and the U.S. In the UK it was released on 22 July, it peaked at #123 on the UK singles chart.

Music video
On 5 March 2012, Natalie posted a Facebook update stating that she was on her way to Tenerife to shoot the music video for the single. A music video was first released onto YouTube on 22 March 2012 at a total length of three minutes and thirty-nine seconds.

Track listing

Chart performance

Weekly charts

Year-end charts

Release history

References

External links
Official Cascada site

2012 singles
2012 songs
Cascada songs
Songs written by Yanou
Songs written by DJ Manian
Universal Music Group singles
Songs written by Andres Ballinas
Songs written by Tony Cornelissen